Anna Chakvetadze was the defending champion, but chose not to participate that year.

Amélie Mauresmo won the title, defeating Elena Dementieva in the final 7–6(9–7), 2–6, 6–4. This was Mauremso's final WTA singles title before her retirement at the end of 2009.

Seeds

Draw

Finals

Top half

Bottom half

References

External links
Draw

Open GDF Suez - Singles
Singles 2009